The "Volkslied van Transvaal" was the national anthem of the South African Republic, also known as the Transvaal Republic, written and composed by Catharina van Rees in 1875. The anthem was presented to president Thomas Burgers during his 1875 visit to Europe.

Lyrics

See also

 National anthem of South Africa
 Die Stem van Suid-Afrika
 National anthem of the Orange Free State
 List of national anthems

References

External links
National Anthem of the Transvaal, Verses 1 and 3
 

Historical national anthems
South African Republic
Boer Republics
African anthems
Dutch-language songs